Erlendsson is a surname. Notable people with the surname include:

Eysteinn Erlendsson (died 1188), Archbishop of Nidaros from 1161 to his death
Haukr Erlendsson (died 1334), the writer of the Hauksbók
Magnus Erlendsson, Earl of Orkney, the first Earl of Orkney to bear that name, ruled from 1108 to c. 1115